Apistoneura psarochroma is a moth of the family Gracillariidae. It is known from Namibia and Zimbabwe.

References

Gracillariinae
Moths of Africa
Moths described in 1961